The Himmerland Rundt is a one-day road cycling race held annually in the Danish region of Himmerland. It is organized as a part of the UCI Europe Tour in category 1.2. It was first organized in 2011.

Past winners

References

External links
 

Cycle races in Denmark
Recurring sporting events established in 2011
2011 establishments in Denmark
UCI Europe Tour races
Spring (season) events in Denmark